Pineia (Greek: Πηνεία) is a former municipality in Elis, West Greece, Greece. Since the 2011 local government reform it is part of the municipality Ilida, of which it is a municipal unit. The municipal unit has an area of 148.572 km2. Its seat of administration was in the village Simopoulo. Pineia is named after the river Pineios, which forms its northern border. The area is hilly and sparsely populated. It is about 20 km east of Amaliada, 25 km northeast of Pyrgos and 45 km southwest of Patras.

Subdivisions
The municipal unit Pineia is subdivided into the following communities (constituent villages in brackets):
Agnanta (Agnanta, Ampelakia)
Agrapidochori (Agrapidochori, Valmi, Kotrona)
Anthonas (Anthonas, Kalo Paidi)
Avgi (Avgi, Oraia)
Efyra (Efyra, Pirio)
Kampos
Laganas
Latas
Loukas (Loukas, Prinari)
Mazaraki (Mazaraki, Apidoula, Prodromos)
Oinoi
Rodia (Rodia, Akropotamia)
Simopoulo (Simopoulo, Agios Nikolaos)
Skliva
Velanidi (Velanidi, Roupakia, Souli)
Vouliagmeni (Vouliagmeni, Gavrakia)

Historical population

See also

List of settlements in Elis

References

External links 
Municipality of Pineia
GTP - Pineia

Populated places in Elis